Clérambault or de Clérambault may refer to:

Louis-Nicolas Clérambault (1676–1749), French organist and composer
Gaëtan Gatian de Clérambault (1872–1934), French psychiatrist
Philippe de Clérambault de La Palluau (1606–1665), Marshal of France
Philippe de Clérambault, Count de Palluau, son of Philippe, lieutenant general, killed (drowned) at the Battle of Blenheim
Jules de Clérambault (c. 1660–1714), son of Philippe, ecclesiastic and member of the Académie française
Clérambault (novel), Romain Rolland's 1920 war novel